The Best American Nonrequired Reading was a yearly anthology of fiction and nonfiction selected annually by high school students in California and Michigan through 826 Valencia and 826michigan.  The volume was part of The Best American Series and was initially edited by Dave Eggers. In the editor's note to the 2013 volume, Eggers stated that the 12th edition would be his last as editor. The 2014 volume was edited by Daniel Handler, a.k.a. Lemony Snicket. The 2019 was the last volume as it has been discontinued by Houghton Mifflin Harcourt.

Series summary

See also
The Best American Nonrequired Reading 2007
The Best American Nonrequired Reading 2008

Notes

External links
 The Best American Nonrequired Reading

Book series introduced in 2002
Fiction anthologies
Nonrequired Reading
Anthology series